Prečna is a settlement northwest of the town of Novo Mesto in southeastern Slovenia. The area is part of the traditional region of Lower Carniola and is now included in the Southeast Slovenia Statistical Region.

The local parish church is dedicated to Saint Anthony of Padua and belongs to the Roman Catholic Diocese of Novo Mesto. It was built in 1907 in a Neo-Gothic style on the site of an older church dedicated to the Prophet Elijah.

References

External links
Prečna on Geopedia

Populated places in the City Municipality of Novo Mesto